Maeve Esther Enid Kyle, OBE, née Shankey (born 6 October 1928), is an Irish Olympic athlete and hockey player. She was born in County Kilkenny. She competed in the 100m and 200m in the Melbourne Olympics and subsequently in the Rome Olympics and Tokyo Olympics (where she reached the semi-finals of both the 400m and 800m). She took bronze in the 400m at the 1966 European Indoor Athletics Championships in Dortmund. She won four gold medalsa in W45 Category in World Masters Championship in Gothenburg in the 100m, 400m, high jump and long jump. She held World Masters records at W40 for the 100m (12:00 secs) and 400m (55.30 secs) and W45 100m (12.50 secs) and W50 long jump at 5.04m.

In hockey, she gained 58 Irish caps as well as representing three of the four Irish provinces (Leinster, Munster and Ulster) at different stages of her career. She was named in the World All Star team in 1953 and 1959. She was also a competitor in tennis, swimming, sailing and cricket and now works as a coach. She is chair of Coaching NI. In 2006, she was awarded the honorary degree of Doctor of the University (DUniv) from the University of Ulster.

Kyle briefly attended Kilkenny College where her father C.G. Shankey was headmaster, before attending Alexandra College and finally, Trinity College, Dublin.  She is the granddaughter of William Thrift. Kyle was awarded the Lifetime Achievement Award at the 2006 Coaching Awards in London in recognition of her work with athletes at the Ballymena and Antrim Athletics Club. Earlier in 2006 she was one of 10 players who were initially installed into Irish hockey's Hall of Fame. She was appointed Officer of the Order of the British Empire (OBE) in the 2008 New Year Honours.

Athletics international competitions

References

External links
Maeve Kyle
Ballymena & Antrim Athletics Club
Kyle named OBE

1928 births
Living people
Irish female field hockey players
Olympic athletes of Ireland
Officers of the Order of the British Empire
Athletes (track and field) at the 1956 Summer Olympics
Athletes (track and field) at the 1960 Summer Olympics
Athletes (track and field) at the 1964 Summer Olympics
Commonwealth Games competitors for Northern Ireland
Athletes (track and field) at the 1958 British Empire and Commonwealth Games
Athletes (track and field) at the 1970 British Commonwealth Games
Sportspeople from County Kilkenny
People educated at Kilkenny College
Irish female sprinters
Irish female middle-distance runners
Alumni of Trinity College Dublin
People educated at Alexandra College
Irish Anglicans
Ireland international women's field hockey players
Pembroke Wanderers Hockey Club players
Instonians field hockey players
Olympic female sprinters